The Truro Bearcats were a Canadian Senior ice hockey team from Truro, Nova Scotia.  The Bearcats were the 1998 Allan Cup Canadian National champions of Senior hockey.

History
In 1998, the Truro Bearcats became only the second team from Nova Scotia to win the Allan Cup.

The Bearcats started off the 1997-98 season by announcing that the team would cease operation to help make way for the upstart Truro Bearcats Junior "A" team after twelve years of operation.  For their final year, the Canadian Amateur Hockey Association awarded them the right to host the 1998 Allan Cup.

In the first game of the Allan Cup, the Bearcats beat the Powell River Regals 5-1.  In their second game, they tied the Ile des Chenes North Stars 1-1.  They closed out the round robin with a 5-3 win over the London Admirals.  The victory allowed them to finish first in the round robin and advance directly to the Allan Cup final.  In front of a hometown crowd, the Bearcats again faced London, beating them soundly 6-1 to win their only ever Allan Cup.  This would be the last game ever played by the Bearcats.

External links
Official Allan Cup page
Truro Daily's write up of Allan Cup victory

Ice hockey teams in Nova Scotia
Senior ice hockey teams
Truro, Nova Scotia
Ice hockey clubs established in 1985
1985 establishments in Nova Scotia
1998 disestablishments in Nova Scotia
Sports clubs disestablished in 1998